Tod Swank is an American former professional skateboarder, company owner (Tum Yeto distribution and Foundation skateboards), photographer, and musician. His mid-1980s skateboard 'zine, Swank Zine, was among the original wave of underground xeroxed press.

References

External links

Gallery of Swank boards

American skateboarders
Living people
Year of birth missing (living people)